California State University, Northridge (CSUN  or Cal State Northridge) is a public university in the Northridge neighborhood of Los Angeles, California. With a total enrollment of 38,551 students (as of Fall 2021), it has the second largest undergraduate population as well as the third largest total student body in the  California State University system, making it one of the largest comprehensive universities in the United States in terms of enrollment size. The size of CSUN also has a major impact on the California economy, with an estimated $1.9 billion in economic output generated by CSUN on a yearly basis. As of Fall 2021, the university had 2,187 faculty, of which 794 (or about 36%) were tenured or on the tenure track.

California State University, Northridge was founded first as the Valley satellite campus of California State University, Los Angeles. It then became an independent college in 1958 as San Fernando Valley State College, with major campus master planning and construction. The university adopted its current name of California State University, Northridge in 1972. The 1994 Northridge earthquake caused $400 million in damage to the campus, the heaviest damage ever sustained by an American college campus.

The university offers 134 different bachelor's degree and master's degree programs in 70  fields, as well as 4 doctoral degrees (2 Doctor of Education programs, Doctor of Audiology, and Doctor of Physical Therapy) and 24 teaching credentials. It is classified among "Master's Colleges & Universities: Larger Programs".

CSUN is home to the National Center on Deafness and the university hosts the annual International Conference on Technology and Persons with Disabilities, more commonly known as the CSUN Conference. Cal State Northridge is a Hispanic-serving institution.

History

Establishment
The establishment of CSUN began in 1952 with the proposal of a new satellite campus for Los Angeles State College (now known as California State University, Los Angeles), to be established in Baldwin Hills. However, San Fernando Valley advocates persuaded state officials to change the location to Northridge after a meeting at the Brown Derby restaurant on Wilshire Boulevard. The official groundbreaking of the university occurred on January 4, 1956, and was performed by, among others, the Governor of California Goodwin Knight and Los Angeles State College President Howard S. McDonald. While it is situated in a suburban location nowadays, it was a rural location during its founding with several agricultural lands having to be cleared to start construction.

1956–1965
Classes started on September 24, 1956, in temporary buildings, with an enrollment of 1,500 students. Delmar Oviatt, the former namesake of the current campus library, was the dean of the satellite campus until July 1, 1958, when the campus separated from Los Angeles State College and was renamed San Fernando Valley State College (popularly abbreviated to Valley State College, Valley State, or SFVSC) after the California Legislature passed Assembly Bill No. 971. Ralph Prator was assigned as the first president of the university and enrollment reached 2,525 with a tuition of $29 per semester. During that same year, the first graduation ceremony was held for around 100 students at the Hollywood Bowl before being moved to campus during subsequent years. In 1959, the university became the first State College to have its own computer. In 1964, the pioneering computer lab was moved into new quarters in the recently completed Sierra Hall building complex, and student enrollment reached nearly 12,000. Other buildings were also swiftly constructed during the early 1960s to accommodate this rapidly growing student population. Additionally, in November 1963 the university established its own radio station, which continues operation to this day as KCSN.

On October 25, 1960, then vice presidential nominee Lyndon B. Johnson visited the campus accompanied by Governor Pat Brown to hold a rally in front of approximately 3,500 students. While some attending students were holding banners in support of his opponents, Johnson used the opportunity to criticize the opposing Republican Party and their candidate Richard Nixon. Four years later, then Republican candidate Nelson Rockefeller held a rally at the university in front of around 6,000 students, which was organized by the university's Republican Club. Having just won the primary in Oregon, California would be crucial in deciding the Republican nominee for the 1964 presidential election. Rockefeller held the lead coming into California but nonetheless lost its primary to Barry Goldwater, effectively handing him the Republican nomination. In December 1965, with increasing conversation and tension on the topic of civil rights in the country, the university hosted a debate on the subject between conservative author and commentator William F. Buckley Jr. and liberal African American journalist Louis Lomax.

1966–1972

The campus's quiet, moderately conservative and overwhelmingly white suburban setting did not shield it from a share of the noise, strife and social upheavals of the Vietnam War era. As on many college campuses, there were increasingly large antiwar demonstrations and occasional draft card burnings.

In September 1966, Vice President Hubert Humphrey visited the campus, where he was met by student protest and opposition to the Vietnam War. On March 25, 1968, a presidential primary campaign speech on campus by Robert F. Kennedy drew an orderly crowd of 10,000 and mainly focused on his opposition to the Vietnam War. Shortly thereafter, his opponent Eugene McCarthy also held a rally at the university which drew a crowd of 7,000 spectators; surprisingly smaller than the crowd of Robert Kennedy as campus polling indicated McCarthy was more popular.

However, 1968 would not end quite so peacefully on the campus. The April assassination of Martin Luther King Jr. in Memphis, Tennessee, soon followed by the June assassination of Robert F. Kennedy in Los Angeles, then the August 1968 Democratic National Convention in Chicago, had led to a series of riots throughout the nation. On November 4, the assault of an African American student athlete by his white coach on the CSUN campus led a group of African American students to hold the acting college president and more than 30 staff members hostage in the Administration Building for several hours, pressing demands for greater outreach in minority enrollment and employment and the establishment of minority studies departments. No one was hurt and, under duress, the president agreed to their demands. After subsequent negotiations, minority enrollment was increased and both the Africana and Chicano/a departments were established. Despite an assurance of amnesty, 28 of the students involved were later charged with kidnapping, assault, conspiracy, and false imprisonment, according to scholar Martha Biondi "the most serious crimes ever in the history of campus protest."  19 were convicted and 3 served time in state prison. Almost one month later, a fire started by an arsonist gutted the president's office. 
Furthermore, several massive antiwar demonstrations took place during 1969–1970, variously resulting in campus shutdowns, heavy police responses, violent clashes, hundreds of arrests, and in a few cases serious injuries to demonstrators. The last such demonstration was in May 1971, on the first anniversary of the Kent State shootings.

Aside from the demonstrations, the university also catered to hippie culture when Janis Joplin performed with Big Brother and the Holding Company at what is now the Matadome on May 12, 1968. Additionally, the Newport Pop Festival was held at the Devonshire Downs, now CSUN's North Campus, in June 1969 and attracted 200,000 attendees to watch performances by Jimi Hendrix, Ike & Tina Turner, Marvin Gaye, Jethro Tull and various others.

Despite the turmoil during this period, the university continued to grow and construction of the Oviatt Library began on May 19, 1971. The college also officially renamed itself to California State University, Northridge on June 1, 1972, by action of the Legislature and the Board of Trustees of the California State University.

1973–1988
On October 24, 1973, the Oviatt Library was completed and opened. In 1975, the construction of the CSUN sculpture began at the southeast corner of campus after the design by alumnus John T. Banks. By 1977, enrollment at the university was 28,023, with tuition at $95. In 1981, the campus officially established a foreign exchange student program with Japan, China, Ukraine, South Korea, Taiwan, Brazil and the Netherlands. In 1988, the campus had an enrollment of 31,575 and a $342 tuition fee.

In 1974, in partnership with UC Santa Barbara, CSUN opened the Ventura Learning Center in Ventura. This became the CSUN Ventura Campus in 1988 and was spun off into California State University, Channel Islands in 1998.

1989–1997
In 1990, the Marilyn Magaram Center for Food Science, Nutrition and Dietetics was established; the Oviatt Library east and west wings were added; and the campus could boast of having the California State University system's only fully established astronomy department with a planetarium.

The 1994 Northridge earthquake struck on January 17 and caused $400 million in damage to the campus, the heaviest damage ever sustained by an American college campus. The epicenter was less than two miles (3 km) away on a previously undiscovered blind thrust fault. Later the same month, Vice President Al Gore visited with a promise of funds to help with the reconstruction. Entire sections of the main library, the art building and several other major structures were either physically unusable or too hazardous to occupy. Among the structures judged to be so seriously damaged that repair was not a practical option were the Fine Arts building, designed by noted modernist architect Richard Neutra, and the South Library, the oldest permanent building on campus. The art courtyard survived. Due to inadequate earthquake engineering, the parking structure next to the Matadome was completely destroyed. It is currently a grass field used for kinesiology instruction, though the driveway formerly used to enter it is still visible from Zelzah Avenue. The large American flag atop the Oviatt Library was installed after the earthquake and has been flown ever since. In the aftermath of the 1994 earthquake, CSUN civil engineering faculty and students took part in the research on earthquake protection of building structures, in particular, in the field of seismic performance, vibration control, and base isolation.

Despite the extensive damage, classes for the spring term started only two weeks late. The classes were held in rapidly constructed tents and temporary facilities, remaining campus buildings deemed safe for use, and local high schools, community colleges, and UCLA while the campus was being rebuilt. On January 17, 1995, President Bill Clinton visited the campus to commemorate the first anniversary of the quake.

1997–2019

In April 1999, the Board of CSU trustees decided to give $27 million to construct post-earthquake projects. The university opened the first Central American Studies program in the nation in May 2000. In 2003, both University Hall and Manzanita Hall were opened, marking the completion of the earthquake recovery program. California State University trustees on March 15, 2006, voted their unanimous approval of Envision 2035, the Cal State Northridge planning initiative that framed the university's physical development for the next several decades. The vote approved the revised master plan as well as an increase in the campus' master plan enrollment capacity from 25,000 to 35,000 full-time equivalent students (FTEs). The trustees also certified the final environmental impact report on the plan. The university in 2007, with clean energy advocates, built the new 1 megawatt fuel cell power plant which was the largest of its kind in any university in the world.

The campus community maintained its legacy of activism when budget cuts and tuition fee hikes were announced during the financial crisis of 2007–08. Students formed the Students Against Rising Tuition group and protested while Governor Arnold Schwarzenegger visited the campus in February 2008. Subsequently, students, staff and faculty protested further cuts introduced by the Governor later in the year. Protests against the budget cuts continued on March 4, 2010, when a statewide protest against the budget cuts was organized, with several professors cancelling class and large numbers of students leaving their classes to join the protests and march down Reseda Boulevard. The protests resulted in several arrests, but in turn students raised allegations of abusive behavior from the police. Aside from the protests, politicians continued to visit the campus as in previous decades, this time with visits from 2008 Democratic presidential candidate Hillary Clinton, United States Senators Barbara Boxer and Dianne Feinstein, and a visit in 2016 from future Vice President (then Attorney General of California) Kamala Harris.

The turmoil and budget cuts did not prevent Envision 2035 from being executed. Projects completed as part of the plan included Chaparral Hall (completed in 2009), the Younes and Soraya Nazarian Center for the Performing Arts (opened in 2011), the Student Recreation Center (opened in 2012), the Transit Center (finished in 2012), the Extended University Commons building (completed in 2016), the AS Sustainability Center (finished in 2017), and Lilac Hall (opened in 2019). In the near future, CSUN also announced they were planning to build an on-campus hotel, to reconstruct the University Student Union, and to build a Center for Integrated Design & Manufacturing. It also extensively advocated for the planned North San Fernando Valley Bus Rapid Transit project which would connect to CSUN.

This period also saw increased donations to the university, with gift commitments reaching a record $31.7 million in 2018. Major donations included $7 million from Michael Eisner in 2002, $7.3 million from the Bayramian family estate in 2005, $10 million from Mike Curb in 2006, $10 million from David Nazarian in 2014, and a record $17 million from Younes Nazarian in 2017. Various corporations like Amazon Alexa, Autodesk, Ernst & Young, the Hollywood Foreign Press Association, KPMG and NASA also provided support to the university. This period also saw an increase in sponsored research.

In 2019, a record 11,627 students graduated from the university. The same year, president Dianne F. Harrison announced she would retire at the end of June 2020.

2020-present 
Like many other universities around the U.S. and the world, CSUN was heavily affected by the COVID-19 pandemic. The university ceased in-person instruction on March 12, 2020, when the pandemic started to take hold in the United States. Two months later, the California State University was the first in the nation to announce that fall instruction would also be almost exclusively online. The university saw major revenue losses as a result of the pandemic and announced a budget cut in August 2020, despite receiving the 7th largest amount in the nation from the first wave of Covid relief funds under the CARES Act. In total, CSUN received the most federal Covid relief funds ($265 million) out of all universities in California after the three waves of relief funds from the CARES Act, Consolidated Appropriations Act, 2021, and American Rescue Plan Act of 2021. In January 2021, CSUN became a vaccination site. When the site closed in June of the same year, around 250,000 people had been vaccinated on the campus.

CSUN received the two largest donations in its history in 2021. On June 15, 2021, the university announced it had received a donation of $40 million from MacKenzie Scott and her husband Dan Jewett; the largest gift from a single donor in its history. Three months later CSUN announced it had received the second largest donation in its history, $25 million, from Apple. The donation, combined with $25 million of state appropriations, would be used for the establishment and construction of a Global Hispanic Serving Institution (HSI) Equity Innovation Hub. The hub will allow for collaboration from across the CSU and other hispanic-serving institutions to improve student success, equity, and prepare students from historically disadvantaged backgrounds for STEM careers. Moreover, Apple will provide technology, design support and creative support at the hub as the project matures. The public–private partnership was made possible by political support from various state politicians, including Governor Gavin Newsom and Senator Alex Padilla, as well as an initial donation of $1 million from Autodesk.

Academics

Admissions 

In the fall of 2018 there were 60,519 applicants, of which 31,102 were admitted for an acceptance rate of 51.4%. As of fall 2018, CSUN has the largest enrollment percentage of Latino Americans that are not Mexican American in the Cal State system. These are Latino Americans with heritage from Central America, South America and the Caribbean. In addition, CSUN has the third largest enrollment percentage of non-residents in the California State University system.

International students
For the academic year 2015–2016, the number of foreign students who attended U.S. institutions exceeded the one million mark. During the same year, CSUN was ranked as the number one Master's institution, having the highest number of international students in the United States. The total number of international students for that academic year totaled 3,924.

Colleges
CSUN is divided into nine colleges:
Mike Curb College of Arts, Media, & Communication
College of Humanities
College of Science and Mathematics
College of Social & Behavioral Sciences
David Nazarian College of Business & Economics
Michael D. Eisner College of Education
College of Engineering & Computer Science
College of Health & Human Development
Roland Tseng College of Extended Learning

Joint degrees
The university, in partnership with Southwestern Law School, offers a dual B.A./J.D degree. The program allows students to graduate within six years instead of the traditional seven if both degrees were taken separately. The program began in fall 2014 with an estimated cohort size of 35 students. In addition, students accepted into the program receive an initial $10,000 Wildman/Schumacher entering student scholarship. Students in the program will have their first year of law school double count as their fourth year of undergraduate education.

The Roland Tseng College of Extended Learning is a division within the university aimed at addressing the educational needs of mid-career professionals. The college develops and offers study opportunities which are designed to ensure that the individuals, communities and organizations served by the university achieve their lifelong learning goals.

Community College Collaboratives 
CSUN offers a pathway program for academic progression in the field of Nursing that links CSUN with designated California Community College (CC) partners. This program enables students who are interested in attaining an ADN to earn a BSN degree in just  years from starting the program. Students will be concurrently enrolled in both nursing programs, taking courses for their BSN while completing their associate degree at the community college. On completion of their ADN students will be able to complete their BSN in one year. Students must be accepted into an ADN program at one of the participating community colleges.

The following California Community Colleges are currently partnered up with CSUN Nursing: Glendale Community College, College of the Canyons, Los Angeles Valley College, and Pierce College.

Central American Studies Department
Central American Studies is an interdisciplinary academic space with an emphasis on the transnational character of Central America. The department is the only program to focus on Central Americans in the United States. The Central American Studies program was established in 2000 after years of lobbying were derailed by the 1994 Northridge earthquake. The program began with a minor which required 18 units for graduation and developed into a Bachelor of Arts program with 13 graduates in 2017.

Research
CSUN has long been recognized as a major supplier of PhD students by the National Science Foundation. The university ranked fifth in the number of undergraduate students who went on to earn a PhD in the category of master's colleges and universities in the 1999–2003 time frame (with a total of 264 alumni went on to earn a PhD in this time frame). The other universities in the top 5 of this category, with the exception of the James Madison University at fourth place, were also California State Universities. This trend has persisted in more recent years, with CSUN ranking 4th in this category in 2018 (with a total of 65 alumni who obtained a PhD in that year).
As a result, alumni have become professors at Ivy League institutions (including professor of economics and public affairs Mark Watson at Princeton University, associate professor of surgery Michael F. Daily at Dartmouth College, and associate professor of services marketing Robert Kwortnik at Cornell University) as well as various Public and Hidden Ivies, and other prominent institutions like New York University.

CSUN also has a high amount of research activity for a master's level university. Since 2015, CSUN receives around $35 million annually in research funding from over 210 awards each year. For the most recent fiscal year of 2018, CSUN received funding just shy of $35.5 million from 232 grants. The College of Math and Science at CSUN is the biggest recipient of grant money, with just over $10.5 million in funding in fiscal year 2018. Its faculty are published in numerous articles in peer-reviewed journals each year.

To support research activities for both faculty and students, CSUN built a  research facility. Half of this building, named Lilac Hall, is currently occupied by The Health Equity Research & Education (HERE) Center, which is funded by a $22 million NIH grant to support biomedical and health equity research at CSUN in the form of the BUILD PODER program; the other half of the building houses a laser lab containing femtosecond lasers to study energy flows and electric charges in nanomaterials, with the intention to design more efficient solar energy devices and nanomaterial-based photothermal therapy for cancer treatment. Another major research program at CSUN is the CSUN-UCLA Bridges to Stem Cell Research program. This ongoing collaboration allows undergraduate students to perform research in one of 50 stem cell research labs headed by UCLA faculty. CSUN has also been collaborating with the Princeton Center for Complex Materials at Princeton University since 2006. It is also a co-founder and partner institution of the Research Center for Translational Applications of Nanoscale Multiferroic Systems (TANMS), which was established at UCLA through an $18.5 million NSF grant in 2012. Other institutions involved at the center include Cornell University, University of California, Berkeley, ETH Zurich, University of Texas at Dallas and Northeastern University. In 2019, the university received $3 million from NASA to establish the NASA Autonomy Research Center for STEAHM. The interdisciplinary research center will comprehensively study increasingly autonomous (IA) systems, such as artificial intelligence and automation, through the collaboration between six of the university's colleges, while also collaborating with researchers from NASA's Armstrong Flight Research Center and Jet Propulsion Laboratory.

CSUN is also home to the San Fernando Observatory. It has operated this observatory since 1976 and moved the observatory from its location in Sylmar to the campus in 2016. The observatory mainly functions as a solar observatory, and due to its decades long operation by CSUN, has allowed hundreds of students and faculty members to collect solar data. The photometric images from this facility are used to determine energy changes in the sun and the data collected by this observatory are used by researchers worldwide. The observatory, in combination with the Donald E. Bianchi Planetarium and the stellar (night time) observatory, form the only comprehensive astronomy network in the entire California State University system.

Additionally, over 70 CSUN Engineering and Computer Science students designed, built, programmed, and tested a CubeSat named CSUNSat1, which was funded by NASA's Small Spacecraft Technology Partnership program. Its mission is to test a low temperature-capable energy storage system in space, developed by JPL, which will raise the technology readiness level of this storage system from 4 or 5 to 7. The success of this energy storage system will enable future space missions and scientific studies to conduct more experiments while requiring less energy, mass, and volume. The satellite was launched on 18 April 2017 as part of the ELaNa 17 mission by NASA on the Cygnus CRS OA-7 from Kennedy Space Center in Cape Canaveral to the ISS. The satellite was deployed by NanoRacks on May 17, 2017, and the nominal and cold temperature experiments were completed on June 18, 2017. The satellite is still operational and proceeding with its mission operations.

Various faculty members have been awarded prestigious Guggenheim Fellowships for research and creative activity, while over 50 have won Fulbright awards to conduct research or teach abroad. Recipients of the Guggenheim Fellowships have included Kim Victoria Abeles, Judy Baca, and Sabina Magliocco.

Rankings and recognition

 The 2023 USNWR Best Regional Colleges West Rankings ranks Northridge 13 on Top Public Schools, 15 on Top Performers on Social Mobility.
 The Wall Street Journal ranked CSUN 2	on Most Diverse Learning Environment in the Nation and Sierra Magazine 35 on Sustainable "Cool Schools."
 The 2022 USNWR Best Regional Colleges West Rankings ranks Northridge 13 on best Undergraduate Teaching, 18 on Top Public Schools, 19 on Top Performers on Social Mobility.
 Money Magazine ranked CSUN 45th in the nation out of the nearly 750 schools it included for its 2020-21 Best Colleges ranking. It also ranked the university 29th among the nation's public colleges.
 CSUN was ranked 730th globally among universities by the 2020 Nature Index for the share of publications in high-impact journals.
 CSUN has been consistently recognized as having one of the best film schools in the U.S. and in the world. Its music school holds the same recognition.
 In 2020, Washington Monthly ranked CSUN 6th for "Best Bang for the Buck" out of 215 schools in the U.S. western region.
 Forbes ranked CSUN 92nd in its 2019 ranking of America's Best Value Colleges out of the 300 universities that were included.
 CSUN was ranked 4th in the United States by the Social Mobility Index 2020 college rankings.
 CSUN was ranked 3rd in the nation and 1st in California in the amount of bachelor's degrees awarded to Hispanics. CSUN was also ranked 10th nationally and 4th in California in the amount of master's degrees awarded to Hispanics.
 As of 2021, CSUN ranked 9th among the top 25 undergraduate schools whose alumni pass the California Bar Exam (1st among the CSU campuses), accounting for almost 4,000 attorneys.
 The undergraduate engineering program ranked fifth among California public colleges (Masters level) and fourteenth among U.S. public colleges.
 CSUN, in collaboration with the LA Cleantech Incubator (LACI), ranked 10th worldwide as a top business incubator in 2017/2018. LACI also collaborates with UCLA, Caltech, USC, and California State University, Los Angeles. 
 The College of Business and Economics has been recognized by the U.S. Department of Commerce for its vital role in promoting international trade in the Los Angeles area.
 In 2018, CSUN was designated as an Innovation and Economic Prosperity (IEP) University by the APLU.

Campus

Locations of interest
The CSUN Botanic Garden is located in the southeast quad, near the intersection of Zelzah Avenue and Nordhoff Street. It is part of the Biology Department for university curriculum, and also a regionally important demonstration garden and educational resource for the community. It has new focus projects for plants usable for regionally local sustainable landscaping using sustainable gardening techniques and studying and 'planting' ethnobotany insights and links. One of the few remaining historic orange groves is thriving on the southeastern campus quad. The citrus industry formerly had groves covering much of the San Fernando Valley. The rows of large eucalyptus trees, historic windbreaks for agricultural fields from the late 19th century, are found towering over the perimeters of the campus, surviving planners developing campus expansions with valor.

University Library

The CSUN University Library provides educational, cultural and information services and resources to the students and faculty. Its primary mission is to support and supplement classroom and independent learning; facilitate student and faculty research; and provide students with lifelong skills in identifying, locating, evaluating and synchronizing information.

All library materials are housed in the University Library, a  state-of-the-art facility. There are over 2,500 seats for in-house study. Of note are the Learning Commons, the Creative Media Studio, 5 computer equipped library instruction labs, and over 150 computer workstations devoted to library information resources. Specially equipped computer workstations are located throughout the library for individuals with disabilities, including four assistive technology equipped study rooms for students. During Fall and Spring semesters, the building is open 90 hours a week. The library maintains its own server and web pages providing access to online electronic information and archives 24 hours a day for students and the public at the University Library Digital Collections. The library also maintains its own AS/RS (Automated Storage and Retrieval System) with the capacity of 1.7 million volumes.

The University Library has a physical collection containing 1.3 million volumes, of which over one million are books, and over 245,000 bound periodical volumes. The library subscribes to over 84,000 online journals, 200 online databases and more than 500,000 ebooks. The microform collection contains 3.1 million pieces. There are over 14,000 sound recordings and over 60,000 film and video recordings. The Special Collections & Archives section of the University Library has a large collection of materials on Human Sexuality—possibly the "second largest private collection on human sexuality" behind the Kinsey Institute. In addition, the Teacher Curriculum Center provides a circulating collection of curricular materials for education students and local educators.

In 2019, CSUN president Dianne F. Harrison appointed a campus committee to investigate whether the Oviatt Library should be renamed due to allegations of racism.  In fall 2020, the Oviatt Library Advisory Working Group presented its findings to President Harrison, the Associated Students Senate, and the CSUN Faculty Senate, recommending that the name of Delmar T. Oviatt be removed from the University Library. After approval from CSU Chancellor Timothy White, the name was changed to University Library in December 2020.

Other collections
Other campus departments and centers with collections:
 The Aronstam Library, devoted to communication studies research and scholarship for Communication Studies Department undergraduate, graduate, and faculty members
 The geography department holds a large collection of Sanborn maps
 The Script Library in Manzanita Hall features over 800 screenplays

Earthquake Sculpture Garden
Opened in 2003, the Earthquake Sculpture Garden was created as a means to commemorate those affected by the 1994 Northridge earthquake. This small patch of land, adjacent to the campus bookstore, features actual remnants of the collapsed parking structure weaved into the foliage. The artist, Marjorie Berkson Sievers a CSUN graduate, took inspiration from Peru and its natural architecture. Despite its age, the garden continues to pay homage to the earthquake that majorly impacted the campus and the adjacent community.

Younes and Soraya Nazarian Center for the Performing Arts
The Younes and Soraya Nazarian Center for the Performing Arts (formerly the Valley Performing Arts Center) is a performance venue completed in 2011 at a cost of $125 million. Its  houses a 1,700-seat three-tier concert hall and a 175-seat black box theater, as well as rehearsal rooms, academic and production support spaces, classrooms, and a lecture hall. In 2017, Younes Nazarian and his wife, Soraya Nazarian, donated $17 million to rename the Valley Performing Arts Center to the Younes and Soraya Nazarian Center for the Performing Arts, also known as The Soraya.

Student Recreation Center
The Student Recreation Center is a 138,000 square foot facility for exercise and leisure activity. The facility opened in January 2012 after 24 months of construction and cost a total of $62,354,790. The Student Recreation Center was originally named the Fitness Centre and it opened its doors in 1995.

University Student Union
The University Student Union or USU, is a non-profit student organization that strives to better the college experience. The USU provides a variety of involvement opportunities, programs, services, and job opportunities. In July 2019, it was announced that the USU complex will be reconstructed and expanded. The project is named "The New Heart of Campus" and will cost an estimated $130 million to both replace the old USU complex with a new three story,  complex and renovate an additional . This project will be financed by both an additional student fee and $24 million in reserves from the University Student Union itself. Construction is set to begin in spring 2020 and the estimated opening date will be in the 2022–2023 academic year.

Pride Center 
The California State University, Northridge, Pride Center or CSUN Pride Center is an LGBTQIA+ organization located in the University Student Union that supports students of all orientations. The Pride Center officially opened its doors on September 27, 2012.

Veteran Resource Center 
The Veteran Resource Center (VRC) is located within the University Student Union (USU). The VRC is a designated area for veteran students to seek camaraderie and support as they transition from military service to academia. The VRC has a variety of resources such as: several desktop computers, a rest area, sitting area, and a TV for community use. The VRC is open to all CSUN students.

A service provided by the Veteran Resource Center is their Mentoring Program. The Veteran Mentor Program provides support and excellent resources to Veteran students. The goal is to help Veterans transition from military service to college life as students at CSUN. The mentor program will meet with the Veteran throughout the semester, offering referrals and to serve as positive role models. The program provides someone with shared experiences, connection with other CSUN students and programs.

Oasis Wellness Center 
The Oasis Wellness Center is located beneath the USU computer lab and next to the Plaza Pool. The Oasis Wellness Center opened in the fall semester of August 2015 with the sole purpose of providing students with a place of peace and tranquility in order to help achieve academic success. Some programs and services provided at the Oasis Wellness Center include massage therapy, power-napping sleep pods, by appointment, nutrition classes and yoga. The Oasis Wellness Center is open to all CSUN students.

CSUN Food Pantry 
The CSUN Food Pantry's ultimate goal is to help students in need by providing basic emergency necessities like food and personal care items. It's free of cost with no questions asked. It's to help students in need so their academic success isn't affected by these situations. Having over 40,000 students on campus this service opened up in August 2017. The pantry is in Laurel Hall. This is open to any CSUN student, staff/faculty and local community members.

National Center on Deafness
The National Center on Deafness was established in 1972 as a way to serve deaf students at the university. Support services such as sign language interpreters, real-time captioners, and notetakers are coordinated from this center, as well as serving as a location of academic advisement and gathering of deaf students. For the 2008 Fall semester, approximately 200 deaf students were served by the National Center on Deafness.

Since 1988 the Strache Leadership Award has been awarded at the CSUN Conference for leadership in the field of disability and technology. The award recognizes the role of education and mentorship while remaining a leader in their field.

Since 2013 the CSUN Conference has issued a Call for Papers and selected papers become part of the Journal on Technology & Persons with Disabilities. In 2018, Journal began providing awards for The Dr. Arthur I. Karshmer Award for Assistive Technology Research for leading researchers in the Assistive Technology, Accessibility and Inclusion.

Film and television shoots
Because of its proximity to Hollywood and its diverse array of modern architecture, the campus has long been an attractive filming location for motion picture and television productions. An early example is the 1966 film The Glass Bottom Boat, for which parts of Sierra Hall and the Engineering Building were temporarily dressed up as NASA facilities. It has appeared in American Idol, Arrested Development, Ringer, Chuck, Dexter, My Name Is Earl, CSI: Crime Scene Investigation, Criminal Minds, Commander in Chief, Van Wilder, Six Feet Under, The Karate Kid, Battlestar Galactica, The Office, McMillan & Wife, Son in Law, Bring It On: Fight to the Finish, Legally Blonde 2, Buffy the Vampire Slayer, Roswell, The Nick Cannon Show, Quincy, M.E., Georgia Rule, and Sky High (in which the Oviatt Library is prominently featured). The Barry Levinson-directed What Just Happened was filmed at the Oviatt Library and featured Robert De Niro and Sean Penn. The pilot of the remake of the television series "Knight Rider" filmed a car chase on the campus, which stood in for Stanford University. During the spring break of 2008, the library served as Starfleet Academy for Star Trek (2009 version). The parking lots to the north of the campus were featured in the movie Superbad. In September 2014, CSUN's Matador Bookstore and Oviatt Library served as backdrops for the Netflix movie We Are Your Friends, starring Zac Efron. In the Fall of 2016, CSUN's Citrus Hall, Jerome Richfield Hall, and Sierra Quad were featured in the television series Lucifer. The Valley Performing Arts Center saw extensive use in the web-series VGHS.

With one of the most recent filming of The Orville, Season 2, a Fox show starring Seth MacFarlane was filmed in front of The Oviatt Library in April 2017. Following the filming of The Good Place, an NBC TV show that is a comedy fiction series created by Michael Schur, various cast members, including Kristen Bell and Ted Danson, were spotted at CSUN. The Good Place Season 3 was filmed on campus in April 2018: exterior shots include Bayramian Hall, Manzanita Hall and the Younes and Soraya Nazarian Center for the Performing Arts (formerly known as the Valley Performing Arts Center); interior shots include Noski Auditorium and the Extended University Commons.

Athletics

CSUN fields 19 teams at the NCAA Division I level. CSUN fields both men's and women's teams in basketball, cross country, golf, soccer, indoor and outdoor track and field, and volleyball. CSUN also has baseball and softball and fields women's teams in beach volleyball, tennis and water polo. Due to state and university budget deficits, CSUN dropped football following the 2001 season. The football team cost the university $1 million a year and had little fan support. CSUN also dropped men's and women's swimming in 2010 due to a statewide and campus budget crisis. CSUN is one of only 45 schools in the nation that has a beach volleyball program.

CSUN moved up to Division I in 1990. Before moving up, the university won 34 national titles at the Division II level which still ranks third all time. CSUN was a member of the Big Sky Conference from 1996 to 2001. They have been a member of the Big West Conference ever since for most sports. The men's and women's indoor track and field teams and the men's volleyball team compete in the Mountain Pacific Sports Federation instead.

Since moving up to Division I CSUN has produced two NCAA national runner-up teams: the men's volleyball team in 1993 and softball team in 1994. The Matadors softball team has appeared in three Women's College World Series in 1981, 1993 and 1994, advancing to the title game in 1994 before falling to Arizona. In 2010 the men's volleyball team spent several weeks as the number one ranked team in the nation and also made the Final Four but lost to Penn State in a semi-final match.

The men's basketball team has made it to the NCAA tournament two times in 2001 and 2009. The team made it to three Big Sky championship games in 1997, 2000 and 2001. CSUN beat Eastern Washington in 2001 to advance to their first NCAA tournament. CSUN was seeded 13th and lost to the fourth seed Kansas in the round of 64. CSUN has played in two Big West championship games in 2004 and 2009. CSUN beat Pacific in 2009 and was seeded 15th in the NCAA tournament and lost to the second seed Memphis.

The women's basketball team won the Big West Championship for the first time in 2014. They were the 16th seed in the NCAA tournament and lost to the first seed South Carolina.

CSUN men's Soccer reached the 3rd Round of the 2006 NCAA tournament, knocking out Big West Conference rival UC Santa Barbara in the 2nd Round.

The Women's Track and Field team won six straight Big West titles from 2006 to 2011. The men's Track and Field team has won three Big West titles in 2007, 2009 and 2010.

The men's and Women's Basketball and Volleyball teams all play in the 2,500 seats Matadome located in Redwood Hall.

CSUN's sports teams are known as the Matadors. In 1958 a student vote chose the school colors red and white and 'Matadors' as the school mascot over 158 nominations for possible nicknames. Matadors was elected over four other finalists Apollos, Falcons, Rancheros and Titans.

The men's and women's boxing teams compete in the National Collegiate Boxing Association. CSU hosted the 2016 national championships for the United States Intercollegiate Boxing Association.

The CSUN Esports Club currently hosts several teams for a variety of competitive video games such as League of Legends, Overwatch, Valorant, and Counter-Strike: Global Offensive. As of 2020, the CSUN Esports Club has been officially affiliated by Cloud9, an American Esports Organization under their Cloud9 University Affiliate Program.

Campus life

Clubs and organizations
CSUN encourages students to enhance their overall college experience by joining clubs and organizations. There are more than 300 student clubs and organizations at CSUN. Through the Matador Involvement Center, students also have the opportunity to start a new club. All clubs and organizations at CSUN must sign a non-hazing contract. CSUN has a zero tolerance for any form of hazing.

CSUN clubs can be located at the CSUN Mata Sync Page . The Mata Sync page allows you to search through the many clubs available in addition read a small description of the club's purpose. Through the CSUN Mata Sync page, it also allows students to search for clubs through categories, such as Community Service, Cultural, Fraternity/Sorority, Honors, Political, Religious, Special Interest, Sports club, University Department/Program.

Fraternities and sororities
The university is home to many fraternal organizations, and each are members of a council. There are five councils at the university: Independent Greek Council, Interfraternity Council, National Pan-Hellenic Council, Panhellenic Council, and United Sorority and Fraternity Council. The Organizations in the North American Interfraternity Conference are Zeta Beta Tau, Kappa Sigma, Sigma Chi, Lambda Chi Alpha, Phi Kappa Psi, Beta Gamma Nu, Sigma Phi Epsilon, Alpha Epsilon Pi, Sigma Nu, Phi Delta Theta and Sigma Alpha Epsilon, along with eight National Panhellenic Conference members, which includes Alpha Omicron Pi, Alpha Xi Delta, Alpha Phi, Delta Delta Delta, Delta Zeta, Kappa Kappa Gamma, Phi Mu, and Sigma Alpha Epsilon Pi. The university's Pi Kappa Phi chapter surrendered their charter in 2014 following the hazing related death of Armando Villa.

CSUN also has four organizations from the National Pan-Hellenic Council which include Kappa Alpha Psi, Phi Beta Sigma, Alpha Kappa Alpha, Sigma Gamma Rho, & Zeta Phi Beta.

The campus has fourteen United Sorority and Fraternity Council members, such as Gamma Zeta Alpha fraternity and Lambda Theta Nu sorority, Alpha Pi Sigma sorority, Lambda Theta Phi fraternity, Lambda Sigma Gamma sorority, Nu Alpha Kappa fraternity, Phi Lambda Nu fraternity, Phi Lambda Rho sorority, Sigma Alpha Zeta sorority, Sigma Lambda Beta fraternity, Sigma Lambda Gamma sorority, Sigma Omega Nu sorority, and Sigma Tau Alpha (co-ed).
Lastly, Independent Greek Council includes Alpha Epsilon Omega, Alpha Gamma Alpha, Alpha Nu Kappa, Alpha Psi Rho, Alpha Sigma Theta, Beta Gamma Nu, Delta Sigma Pi, Gamma Rho Lambda, Omega Phi, Phi Psi Omega, Rho Delta Chi, and Tau Omega Rho.

Greek Life at the university has been beneficial to both the campus and surrounding community. The Greek community established the Matador Patrol over twenty years ago to aid the campus police department and has over the years evolved into the Community Service Assistant Unit of the Department of Police Services. Aside from its original function of providing free safety escorts to the campus community, it is now also responsible for safety patrols at the on-campus student apartments, safety watches at the University Library and University Student Union facilities, and special event staffing.

After the death of Armando Villa, who died during an 18-mile hike when pledging for a fraternity, CSUN abolished hazing from any on campus organizations/clubs. CSUN created a non-hazing agreement for all clubs and organizations on campus to follow. Any club/organization that did not complete the agreement would not be recognized by the university. In the agreement, it clearly states that the university will have zero tolerance for any and all acts of hazing. Anyone found to be in violation of these guidelines may be held collectively and/or individually responsibly through the CSUN clubs and Organization Review Process, the CSU Student Code of Conduct, and/or additional authority review.

Not only are there various Greek organizations, but there are also many political, religious, and cultural clubs on campus, including the Chabad at CSUN and Hillel: The Foundation for Jewish Campus Life for Jewish students, Students for Justice in Palestine, MEChA and the Hip-Hop Think Tank.

Events

Noontime Concerts 

The AS/SPACE (Associated Students / Student Productions and Campus Entertainment) produced a weekly concert series held on Wednesdays at noon in the quad of the University Student Union.  The concerts featured local and national musical artist and bands. Notable concerts included:

 April's Motel Room
 Bone Thugs-n-Harmony
 Digable Planets

 Face to Face
 Fretblanket
 Gin Blossoms
 John Easedale of Dramarama
 Kara's Flowers (Maroon 5)
 Mary's Danish
 The Mighty Rhythm Trax
 Montel Jordan
 No Doubt
 Notorious B.I.G.
 Rage Against the Machine
 Red Hot Chili Peppers
 Robbie Krieger Band
 The Rugburns
 Smash Mouth
 Sublime
 Voodoo Glow Skulls

Big Show 
The Associated Students has organized the Big Show, a concert where various musicians perform on the Oviatt Lawn, since 2001. Each year, students vote on both the genre and the artists they want to see. This has resulted in a variety of performances throughout the years, with headliners like Jimmy Eat World, Common, Ne-Yo, Ludacris, Diplo, Afrojack, Laidback Luke, DVBBS, Big Sean, Tyga, Dillon Francis, Louis the Child, and ASAP Ferg.

Big Lecture 

Since 2011, the Associated Students also started organizing the Big Lecture series, where influential individuals tell the audience about their experiences and careers. Because of the success of the first lecture by Dr. Cornel West, the series was allowed to continue yearly and has attracted a variety of individuals from different industries and backgrounds. Recent speakers were James Franco, Magic Johnson, Viola Davis, and Laverne Cox.

Media
 KCSN radio
 The Daily Sundial: college newspaper
 Valley View News: student television station
 Scene Magazine: student-created magazine
 Northridge Magazine

Notable programs

3 WINS Fitness 
3 WINS Fitness, formerly known as 100 Citizens, is a free exercise program in Southern California that offers exercise agendas for local communities. This program is implemented by volunteer kinesiology students attending CSUN. In 2012, the program obtained recognition from the White House, winning Popular Choice award in First Lady Michelle Obama's Let's Move video challenge.

Notable people 

With over 350,000 alumni, CSUN has been home to a range of prominent alumni, faculty, and staff.

Politics and government 
In politics, three former faculty and staff members have become high-ranking officials in foreign countries, including Mohamed Morsi who became the 5th President of Egypt in 2012, as well as Mohammad Qayoumi and Prakash Chandra Lohani. At the national level, CSUN has been home to two former heads of the United States Census Bureau (Roy Peel and Vincent Barabba), a former Commissioner of the Bureau of Labor Statistics (Kathleen Utgoff), the Program Executive Officer of the Joint Strike Fighter program (Lt Gen Christopher Bogdan), and a former member of the Council of Economic Advisers and president of the Federal Reserve Bank of Cleveland (Jerry Jordan), as well as the 13th Ambassador to the Bahamas (Nicole Avant), an Ambassador to Mexico (Julian Nava), 6th Governor of Hawaii (Linda Lingle), and 42nd Lieutenant Governor of California (Mike Curb). In 2018, alumnus Katie Hill became a member of the United States House of Representatives, while Alex Villanueva became the 33rd Sheriff of Los Angeles County. The following year, graduate Nury Martinez became the first Latina president of the Los Angeles City Council. On January 20, 2021, alumnus Doug Emhoff became the first Second Gentleman of the United States as he is the spouse of Vice President of the United States Kamala Harris. Later that year Rev. James Lawson, a civil rights leader and visiting scholar at the university since 2010, received the NAACP Image Award – Chairman's Award.

Business 
Shortly after graduating from CSUN, Lee Soo-man founded SM Entertainment in 1989. The company has since grown to become South Korea's largest entertainment company, leading Lee Soo-man to occasionally be referred to as 'the father of K-pop'. In 2008, alumnus Stanford Kurland founded PennyMac Financial Services, a move which was subject to criticism as he was accused of profiting from the financial crisis of 2007–08 which he helped create due to his role in devising and marketing subprime mortages as president of Countrywide Financial. Nonetheless, he remained chairman and CEO of PennyMac until his death in 2021. In 2013, alumnus Stan Polovets was one of the key players in the $55 billion sale of TNK-BP to Rosneft, one of largest mergers ever to occur in the energy sector, due to his role as CEO for the Alfa Group Consortium. Around the same time, alumnus Gene Haas founded Haas F1 Team, having already co-founded the Stewart-Haas Racing NASCAR team in 2002 and his company Haas Automation in 1983. In 2016, alumnus Stephen Bollenbach died after a career in which he served as CFO for the Holiday Corporation and Disney and as CEO for Hilton Worldwide, while Del Mayberry retired as CFO for the Fox Networks Group. Three years later, alumnus Charles Noski became a director at Wells Fargo, having previously served as CFO for Bank of America, Northrop Grumman, and AT&T and as a director for Microsoft. The current CEOs of A&E Networks (Paul Buccieri), Autodesk (Andrew Anagnost), and investment bank Houlihan Lokey (Scott Beiser) are also alumni, as well as the current CFOs of Farmers Insurance Group (Ron Myhan) and PetSmart (Alan Schnaid) and the president and COO of Bank of Hope (David Malone).

Entertainment and the arts 
In entertainment, alumni have won Academy Awards, Grammy Awards, Emmy Awards, and Golden Globes. The award-winners include Paula Abdul, John Densmore (as drummer of The Doors), Michelle DeYoung, Daryl Dragon (as part of Captain & Tennille), Richard Dreyfuss, Jenna Elfman, Mike Elizondo, Gordon Goodwin, Don Hahn, Phil Hartman, Cheech Marin, Brian A. Miller, Andy Summers (as guitarist of The Police), Serj Tankian (as frontman of System of a Down), and Diane Warren. Although former student Debra Winger was nominated three times for the Academy Award for Best Actress as well as nominated five times for Golden Globe Awards, she won none of the nominations. Actresses Alyson Hannigan and Eva Longoria also graduated from CSUN and received People's Choice Awards for their roles in How I Met Your Mother and Desperate Housewives, respectively. Additionally, Lucille Ball was an assistant professor in 1979.

Literature and journalism 
CSUN has produced three Pulitzer Prize winners: Frank del Olmo (Pulitzer Prize for Public Service), Paul Pringle (Pulitzer Prize for Public Service and Pulitzer Prize for Investigative Reporting), and Ken Lubas (photojournalist). Journalist and political commentator Ana Kasparian of The Young Turks network also graduated from CSUN. James Dickey, the 18th United States Poet Laureate and winner of a National Book Award for Poetry, was a visiting lecturer at the university.

Sciences 
In the sciences, CSUN alumni include astronaut Scott J. Horowitz, who flew four Space Shuttle missions, Adriana Ocampo, who is a planetary geologist known for her contributions to the discovery of the Chicxulub crater as well as her work as Science Program Manager at NASA and lead program executive for the New Frontiers Program, and Olympia LePoint, who served as reliability and system safety engineer for various NASA Space Shuttle missions. The university has also had two prominent mathematicians in its faculty: Lorraine Foster, who became the first woman to receive a Ph.D. in mathematics from California Institute of Technology, and William Karush, a mathematician known for Karush–Kuhn–Tucker conditions and physicist on the Manhattan Project. Faculty members Maria Elena Zavala and Stephen Oppenheimer received the Presidential Award for Excellence in Science, Mathematics, and Engineering Mentoring from President Bill Clinton and President Barack Obama, respectively.

Athletics 
Former students have also won various Olympic medals, with Jeanette Bolden (gold medal), Valerie Brisco-Hooks (three gold medals and one silver medal), Alice Brown (two gold medals and one silver medal), Florence Griffith Joyner (three gold medals and two silver medals), Joe Ryan (silver medal), and Bob Samuelson (bronze medal) all winning medals at the Olympic Games. The former four were all coached by alumnus Bob Kersee.

Other 
The 2017 Las Vegas shooting was committed by Stephen Paddock, who graduated from the university in 1977 with a degree in business administration. The shooting killed 58 concertgoers and injured 851, making it the deadliest mass shooting committed by a single person in American history.

Notes

References

External links

 
 CSU Northridge Athletics website
 CSUN Sustainability Plan, 2013–2023

 
Universities and colleges in Los Angeles
Universities and colleges in the San Fernando Valley
Northridge
California State University, Northridge
Northridge, Los Angeles
Educational institutions established in 1958
1958 establishments in California
Schools accredited by the Western Association of Schools and Colleges
Schools of deaf education in the United States